The 1902 Kansas Jayhawks football team was an American football team that represented the University of Kansas as an independent during the 1902 college football season. In their first and only season under head coach Arthur Hale Curtis, the Jayhawks compiled a 6–4 record and outscored opponents by a total of 108 to 93. The Jayhawks played their home games at McCook Field in Lawrence, Kansas. W. D. Vincent was the team captain. They played the first game in the Kansas–Kansas State football rivalry on October 4, winning by a 16–0 score.

Schedule

References

Kansas
Kansas Jayhawks football seasons
Kansas Jayhawks football